Huibers is a Dutch patronymic surname. Huibert is a regional form of the given name Hubert. Among variant forms are Huiberts, Huijbers and Huybers. Notable people with the surname include:

 (1922–2003), Dutch composer and priest
Jessie Huybers (1848–1897), Australian novelist
Johan Huibers (born 1958), Dutch creationist who built 2 Noah's Ark replicas
 (1875–1969), Dutch Bishop of Haarlem 1935–1960
Max Huiberts (born 1970), Dutch football forward
Peter Huybers (born 1974), American climate scientist

See also
Huberts

References

Dutch-language surnames
Patronymic surnames